Joviša Kraljevič (born 20 November 1976) is a Slovenian footballer played for Rudar Velenje as a defender.

External links
Profile at Prvaliga.si

1976 births
Living people
NK Rudar Velenje players
Slovenian footballers

Association football defenders